German submarine U-234 was a Type XB U-boat of Nazi Germany's Kriegsmarine during World War II, she was commanded by Kapitänleutnant Johann-Heinrich Fehler. Her first and only mission into enemy or contested territory consisted of the attempted delivery of uranium oxide and German advanced weapons technology to the Empire of Japan. After receiving Admiral Dönitz' order to surface and surrender and of Germany's unconditional surrender, the submarine's crew surrendered to the United States on 14 May 1945.

Construction
Originally built as a minelaying submarine, she was laid down at the Germaniawerft in Kiel on 1 October 1941; U-234 was damaged during construction, but launched on 23 December 1943.

Sensors

Radar
U-234 was one of the few U-boats that was fitted with a FuMO-61 Hohentwiel U-Radar Transmitter. 
This equipment was installed on the starboard side of the conning tower.

Radar detection
U-234 was also fitted with the FuMB-26 Tunis antenna. The FuMB 26 Tunis combined the FuMB Ant. 24 Fliege and FuMB Ant. 25 Cuba II antennas. It could be mounted in either the Direction Finder Antenna Loop and separately on the bridge.

Wartime service

U-234 returned to the Germaniawerft yard at Kiel on 5 September 1944, to be refitted as a transport. Apart from minor work, she had a snorkel added and 12 of her 30 mineshafts were fitted with special cargo containers the same diameter as the shafts and held in place by the mine release mechanisms. In addition, her keel was loaded with cargo, thought to be optical-grade glass and mercury, and her four upper-deck torpedo storage compartments (two on each side) were also occupied by cargo containers.

Cargo

The cargo to be carried was determined by a special commission, the Marine Sonderdienst Ausland, established towards the end of 1944, at which time the submarine's officers were informed that they were to make a special voyage to Japan. When loading was completed, the submarine's officers estimated that they were carrying 240 tons of cargo plus sufficient diesel fuel and provisions for a six- to nine-month voyage.

In the 1997 book Hirschfeld, Wolfgang Hirschfeld reported that he saw about 50 lead cubes with  sides, and "U-235" painted on each, loaded into the boat's cylindrical mine shafts. According to cable messages sent from the dockyard, these containers held "U-powder".

When the cargo was loaded, U-234 carried out additional trials near Kiel, then returned to the northern German city where her passengers came aboard.

Passengers

U-234 was carrying twelve passengers, including a German general, four German naval officers, civilian engineers and scientists and two Japanese naval officers. The German personnel included General Ulrich Kessler of the Luftwaffe, who was to take over Luftwaffe liaison duties in Tokyo; Kay Nieschling, a Naval Fleet Judge Advocate who was to rid the German diplomatic corps in Japan of the remnants of the Richard Sorge spy ring; Heinz Schlicke, a specialist in radar, infrared, and countermeasures and director of the Naval Test Fields in Kiel (later recruited by the US in Operation Paperclip); and August Bringewalde, who was in charge of Me 262 production at Messerschmitt.

Voyage
U-234 sailed from Kiel for Kristiansand in Norway on the evening of 25 March 1945, accompanied by escort vessels and three Type XXIII coastal U-boats, arriving in Horten Naval Base two days later. The submersible spent the next eight days carrying out trials on her snorkel, during which she accidentally collided with a Type VIIC U-boat performing similar trials. Damage to both submarines was minor, and despite a diving and fuel oil tank being holed, U-234 was able to complete her trials. She then proceeded to Kristiansand, arriving on about 5 April, where she underwent repairs and replenished her provisions and fuel.

U-234 departed Kristiansand for Japan on 15 April 1945, running submerged at snorkel depth for the first 16 days, and surfacing after that only because her commander,  Johann-Heinrich Fehler, considered he was safe from attack on the surface in the prevailing severe storm. From then on, she spent two hours running on the surface by night, and the remainder of the time submerged. The voyage proceeded without incident. The first sign that world affairs were overtaking the voyage was when the Kriegsmarines Goliath transmitter stopped transmitting, soon followed by the Nauen station. Fehler did not know it, but Germany's naval HQ had fallen into Allied hands.

Then, on 4 May, U-234 received a fragment of a broadcast from British and American radio stations announcing that Admiral Karl Dönitz had become Germany's head of state following the death of Adolf Hitler. U-234 surfaced on 10 May for better radio reception and received Dönitz's last order to the submarine force, ordering all U-boats to surface, hoist white flags and surrender to Allied forces. Fehler suspected a trick and managed to contact , whose captain convinced him that the message was authentic.

At this point, the U-boat was almost equidistant from British, Canadian, and U.S. ports. Fehler decided not to continue his journey, and instead headed for the east coast of the United States. Fehler thought it likely that if they surrendered to Canadian or British forces, they would be imprisoned and it could be years before they were returned to Germany; he believed that the United States would probably just send them home.

Fehler consequently decided that he would surrender to U.S. forces, but radioed on 12 May that he intended to sail to Halifax, Nova Scotia, to surrender to ensure Canadian units would not reach him first. U-234 then set course for Newport News, Virginia. During the passage Fehler disposed of his Tunis radar detector, the new Kurier radio communication system, and all Enigma machine related documents and other classified papers. On learning that the U-boat was to surrender, the two Japanese passengers committed suicide by taking an overdose of Luminal, a barbiturate sedative and antiepileptic drug. They were buried at sea.

Capture

The difference between Kptlt. Fehler's reported course to Halifax and his true course was soon realized by US authorities who dispatched two destroyers to intercept U-234. Members of Sutton's crew took command of the U-boat and sailed her to the Portsmouth Naval Shipyard, where U-805, U-873, and U-1228 had already surrendered. Velma Hunt, a retired Penn State University environmental health professor, has suggested U-234 may have put into two ports between her surrender and her arrival at the Portsmouth Navy Yard: once in Newfoundland, to land an American sailor who had been accidentally shot in the buttocks, and again at Casco Bay, Maine. News of U-234's surrender with her high-ranking German passengers made it a major news event. Reporters swarmed over the Navy Yard and went to sea in a small boat for a look at the submarine.

Secret cargo

A classified US intelligence summary written on 19 May listed U-234s cargo as including drawings, arms, medical supplies, instruments, lead, mercury, caffeine, steels, optical glass and brass. That the ship carried  of uranium oxide remained classified for the duration of the Cold War. Author and historian Joseph M. Scalia claimed to have found a formerly secret cable at Portsmouth Navy Yard which stated that the uranium oxide had been stored in gold-lined cylinders rather than cubes as reported by Hirschfeld; the alleged document is discussed in Scalia's book Hitler's Terror Weapons. The exact characteristics of the uranium remain unknown; Scalia and historians Carl Boyd and Akihiko Yoshida have speculated that rather than being weapons-grade material it was instead intended for use as a catalyst in the production of synthetic methanol for aviation fuel.  However, after the war it was learned that the Japanese had cyclotrons and were working on the atomic bomb.

The  of uranium disappeared. It was most likely transferred to the Manhattan Project's Oak Ridge diffusion plant.

Disposition

In popular culture

 The Last U-Boat (1992) directed by Frank Beyer
 Documentary film, Hitler's Last U-Boat Directed by Andreas Gutzeit International Historical Films, Inc. (2001) ASIN B0000646UH

See also

 Japanese-German military technology collaboration

References

Bibliography

 Geoffrey Brooks: Hitler's Terror Weapons, Pen & Sword (2002): 

Webber, Bert, (1985), "Silent Siege-II, Japanese Attacks On North America In WWII. Webber Research Group. 
 Wolfgang Hirschfeld; Geoffrey Brooks, The Story of a U-Boat NCO 1940-1946 Naval Institute Press (1996) 
 Arthur Naujoks, Lee Nelson "The Last Great Secret of the Third Reich", 2002. Council Press.
 Joseph Mark Scalia, Germany's Last Mission to Japan: The Failed Voyage of U-234 Naval Institute Press (2000) 
 A. V. Sellwood: The Warring Seas, 1955. A biography of the career of U-234 commander Johann Fehler.
 Richard Dean Starr, Tides of Justice, a short story featuring U-234 in The Avenger Chronicles edited by Joe Gentile Moonstone Books (June 2008)
 Carter Hydrick, "Critical Mass: How Nazi Germany Surrendered Enriched Uranium for the United States' Atomic Bomb" (2016)

External links

 
 "Radio Intelligence Appreciations Concerning German U-Boat Activity in the Far East"
 Historic footage of surrendered German submarine U-234 under escort, and crew and passengers arriving at Portsmouth Naval Shipyard
 Greatest Mysteries of WWII: Hitler's Last U-Boat U-234 (720P)

German Type X submarines
World War II submarines of Germany
Foreign relations of Nazi Germany
Foreign relations of the Empire of Japan
Nuclear proliferation
1943 ships
Ships built in Kiel
U-boats commissioned in 1944
Ships sunk as targets
U-boats sunk in 1947
Maritime incidents in 1947